Avangrid, Inc. (formerly Energy East and Iberdrola USA), is an energy services and delivery company. AVANGRID serves about 3.1 million customers throughout New England, Pennsylvania and New York in the United States.

History
In 2008 Iberdrola S.A. purchased Energy East. Iberdrola renamed the company Iberdrola USA.

In November 2010, Iberdrola USA sold its gas distribution companies in Connecticut and Massachusetts, the Southern Connecticut Gas Company, Connecticut Natural Gas Corporation, and the Berkshire Gas Company, to UIL Holdings Corporation.

In 2012, Iberdrola USA sold its energy services companies, Energetix and NYSEG Solutions, to Direct Energy.

In February 2015, Iberdrola USA announced that it had entered into a merger agreement with UIL Holdings Corporation under which UIL Holdings Corporation would merge into a subsidiary of Iberdrola USA, Inc. In December 2015, "Iberdrola USA finalized its acquisition of UIL Holdings ... to create a new company, AVANGRID, which will be listed on the New York Stock Exchange as AGR."

Avangrid won an auction for an offshore wind area near North Carolina by bidding $9 million in March 2017.

Avangrid supports the adoption of electric vehicles. In 2017, Avangrid donated $2 million to the Connecticut Hydrogen and Electric Automobile Purchase Rebate program. The program was launched in 2015 and gives money in the form of rebates to consumers who purchase zero-emissions vehicles, which includes electric vehicles. The company also installed electric vehicle charging stations at several of its facilities. In 2018, Avangrid held an "electric vehicle fair" for its employees, with the goal being to make it so that all employees can purchase electric vehicles if they chose to.

In 2021, Avangrid's subsidiary, Central Maine Power Company, was fined $360,000 for violating standards for industry testing. These standards are intended to maintain electrical stability and prevent electrical outages.

Subsidiaries
 Avangrid Renewables
 Berkshire Gas Company (BGC)
 Central Maine Power (CMP)
 Connecticut Natural Gas (CNG)
 New York State Electric & Gas (NYSEG)
 Rochester Gas and Electric (RG&E)
 Maine Natural Gas (MNG)
 Southern Connecticut Gas (SCG)
 The United Illuminating Company (UI)

References

External links

 
 Central Maine Power
 Connecticut Natural Gas
 NYSEG 
 Rochester Gas and Electric

Energy in New England
Electric power companies of the United States
Natural gas companies of the United States
Energy in New York (state)
Companies listed on the New York Stock Exchange
Iberdrola